Hotel Tajikistan is a hotel located at 22 Shotemur Ulitsa, 734001, Dushanbe, Tajikistan. It is a 4-star hotel and was built in 1975 and reconstructed in 2002. A short story titled "Hotel Tajikistan" which is about the hotel in the 1990s has been published by Hackwriters.com.

References

External links

Hotels in Tajikistan
Hotel Tajikistan
Hotels established in 1975
Hotel buildings completed in 1975